Gnana Kuzhandhai is a 1979 Indian Tamil-language Hindu mythological film, directed by K. Kameshwara Rao and written by Era. Pazhanisamy. The film stars Baby Sudha and Master Sridhar, with Gemini Ganesan Venniradai Nirmala V. S. Raghavan R. S. Manohar, S. V. Subbaiah, Jai Ganesh, Latha and K. A. Thangavelu in supporting roles. It was released on 24 June 1979.

Plot

Cast 
 Baby Sudha as Child Gnana Sambanthan
 Master Sridhar as Younger Thiru Gnana Sambanthar
 V. S. Raghavan as Sivapada Hrudiyar
 Gemini Ganesan as Lord Siva
 Venniradai Nirmala as Goddess Parvathi
 Kallapart Natarajan as Agathiyar Munivar
 Thengai Srinivasan as Ambalavaanan
 Manorama as Alangari
 S. Rama Rao as Alangari's Brother
 Jayachitra as Princess Amudhavalli
 Heran Ramasamy as Amudhavalli Father
 Nagesh as Namachivayam, Astrologer
Pakkoda Kadhar as Karpuram
 Sujatha as Thilagavathi
 S. V. Subbaiah as Vakeesan/Thirunavukkarasar
 R. S. Manohar as Mahendrapuri King
Karikol Raju as Puzhalendar, Thilagavathi's father
 S. V. Sahasranamam as Sivanesan
 Tambaram Lalitha as Sivanesan's Wife
 K. A. Thangavelu as Ponni's Father
 Jai Ganesh as Moolan/thirumoolar
 Latha as Ponni
 K. Kannan as Nagan, Ponni's Cousin

Soundtrack 
Music was composed by K. V. Mahadevan and lyrics were written by Kannadasan, A. Maruthakasi, Alangudi Somu, Pazhanisamy and Raja Gopal.

References

External links 

1970s musical films
1970s Tamil-language films
1979 films
Films about shapeshifting
Films about Hinduism
Films about reincarnation
Films directed by Kamalakara Kameswara Rao
Films scored by K. V. Mahadevan
Hindu devotional films
Hindu mythological films
Indian epic films
Indian films based on actual events
Indian musical films
Religious epic films